{{DISPLAYTITLE:C20H42O}}
The molecular formula C20H42O (molar mass: 298.547 g/mol, exact mass: 298.3236 u) may refer to:

 Arachidyl alcohol, or 1-icosanol
 Octyldodecanol
The natural substance 1-Eicosanol has been found in Lonicera japonica, Artemisia baldshuanica, and other organisms.
Molecular formulas